The Association of Flight Attendants-CWA (commonly known as AFA) is a union representing flight attendants in the United States. As of January 2018, AFA represents 50,000 flight attendants at 20 airlines. Since 2004, AFA has been part of the Communications Workers of America (CWA), an affiliate of AFL–CIO. AFA is also an affiliate of the International Transport Workers' Federation.

History

AFA was founded in 1945 by flight attendants at United Airlines. The organization was originally known as Airline Stewardess Association (ALSA). ALSA negotiated its first contract with United in 1946. In 1949, ALSA merged with the Air Line Stewards and Stewardesses Association (ALSSA), an affiliate of the Air Line Pilots Association (ALPA). By 1951, ALSSA had 3,300 members. ALPA created two separate divisions in 1960, one for pilots, and one for stewards and stewardesses. Nearly half of the USA's 8,700 flight attendants were members of ALPA's S&S division at that time. In 1973, ALSSA flight attendants chose self-determination and formed the independent Association of Flight Attendants, leaving ALPA. In 1982, AFA had 22,000 members at 18 American airlines. In 1984, the AFL–CIO granted AFA a charter.

Organizing
In July 2006, Northwest Airlines flight attendants voted to replace their independent union with AFA. AFA's membership rose to 55,000 flight attendants. On November 4, 2010, AFA was decertified by the National Mediation Board as the bargaining representative for the pre-merger Northwest Airlines flight attendants of Delta Air Lines, after narrowly losing a representational election of the combined group the day before. AFA filed objections to the election with the National Mediation Board alleging interference.

On June 29, 2011 AFA won one of the largest private sector union elections in decades, winning representation rights for the combined workforce of approximately 24,000 flight attendants at United Airlines, Continental Airlines and Continental Micronesia. That election was triggered by a National Mediation Board ruling that those airlines had formed a single transportation system as a result of a corporate merger.

CHAOS

CHAOS is AFA's trademarked strategy of intermittent strikes designed to maximize the impact of an industrial action while minimizing the risk for striking flight attendants.

In May 1993, AFA members at Seattle-based Alaska Airlines were facing a 30-day cooling-off period after more than three years of negotiations. In June, 1993, the cooling-off period mandated by the Railway Labor Act had expired. The first CHAOS strike took place in Seattle when three flight attendants walked off an Alaska Airlines flight just before passenger boarding. A month later, another crew of flight attendants struck the last flight out of Las Vegas. A few weeks later, AFA struck five flights simultaneously in the San Francisco area.

America West, AirTran and US Airways all settled with AFA on the eve of, or a few minutes after, the end of a 30-day cooling-off period in the 1990s. AFA flight attendants at Midwest Express (now Midwest Airlines), completed a cooling-off period without reaching agreement on a first contract in 2002. After three weeks of a CHAOS campaign, and on the eve of CHAOS strikes, management agreed to terms that were ratified by the flight attendants. United Airlines flight attendants used the threat of CHAOS to leverage their negotiations during the airline's bankruptcy, succeeding in doubling the value of the replacement retirement plan management had proposed.

Flight attendants at Northwest Airlines, locked in a round of bankruptcy negotiations, deployed a CHAOS campaign days after joining AFA in July, 2006. Union negotiators concluded a new tentative agreement with millions of dollars in improvements, but which was voted down by a narrow margin. AFA continued preparations for CHAOS strikes at Northwest pending the outcome of negotiations and litigation surrounding the case.

The bankruptcy court ruled in favor of the union, denying the strike injunction sought by management. On appeal, the federal district court and the court of appeals ruled that workers under the Railway Labor Act cannot strike in response to rejection of a collective bargaining agreement in bankruptcy. Northwest and AFA returned to negotiations and reached a new tentative agreement, which was narrowly ratified by the flight attendants on May 29, 2007. The flight attendants became the last major work group at Northwest to agree to new contract terms in bankruptcy. The new contract provided Northwest with $195 million in annual cuts through 2011, and secured a $182 million equity claim for the flight attendants before it was lost upon the company's exit from bankruptcy.

Member flight attendant groups
AFA represents the flight attendant bargaining unit at the following airlines:
 Cathay Pacific (US-based cabin crew)

See also

 Communications Workers of America
 Linda Puchala, past president (1979–1986)

Citations

Works cited

External links
 Official AFA International site
 AFA United Airlines MEC
 AFA US Airways MEC
 AFA American Eagle MEC
 Communications Workers of America
 The Council 5 Connection (Local Site)
 The Council 11 Connection (Local Site)
 The Council 42 Website (Local Site)

1945 establishments in the United States
Communications Workers of America
Flight attendants' trade unions
Trade unions established in 1945
Transportation trade unions in the United States